(internally designated ,  and ) is a trans-Neptunian object from the cold classical Kuiper belt located in the outermost region of the Solar System. The object was first observed by the New Horizons Search Team using the Hubble Space Telescope on 6 August 2014, and was a proposed flyby target for the New Horizons probe until 2015, when the alternative target 486958 Arrokoth was selected.

Discovery and designations 

 was discovered by the New Horizons Search Team during an observation campaign intended to search for KBO flyby targets for the New Horizons probe. The observations started in June 2014, and more intensive ones continued in July and August. They were conducted with the help of the Hubble Space Telescope; the object's apparent magnitude of 26.4 is too faint to be observed by ground-based telescopes.  was first discovered in observations on August 6, 2014, and it was designated g12000JZ at the time, nicknamed g1 for short. Its existence as a potential target of the New Horizons probe was revealed by NASA in October 2014 and it was designated PT3; its official provisional designation, was not assigned by the Minor Planet Center until March 2015 after better orbit information was available.

Orbit and classification 

 is a trans-Neptunian object. More specifically, it is a non-resonant classical Kuiper belt object, also known as "cubewano". It orbits the Sun at a distance of 42.1–46.6 AU once every 295 years and 4 months (107,886 days; semi-major axis of 44.4 AU). Its orbit has an eccentricity of 0.05 and an inclination of 4° with respect to the ecliptic. This makes it a typical member of the "cold population" among the cubewanos in the Kuiper belt.

The body's observation arc begins with a precovery taken by the New Horizons KBO Search team with the Subaru Telescope at Mauna Kea Observatory on Hawaii, six week prior to its official first observation by Hubble.

Numbering and naming 

This minor planet has not been numbered by the Minor Planet Center and remains unnamed.

Physical characteristics 

Based on generic magnitude-to-diameter conversion, the object measures 44 km, for an absolute magnitude of 10.3 and an assumed albedo of 0.07. Hubble observations of  show that it is very red in color.

Exploration 

Having completed its flyby of Pluto, the New Horizons space probe was to perform a flyby of at least one Kuiper belt object. Several potential targets were under consideration. (PT3) was considered a second choice after  (PT1), because more fuel was required to carry out a flyby. (PT2) was already no longer under consideration as a potential target.

 is one of the objects that New Horizons observed from greater distances, as part of its extended Kuiper belt mission.

The distant KBO observations provide an important context for the data collected during the close flyby of Arrokoth.

See also 
 List of New Horizons topics

References

External links 
 OPAG: We Did It!, p.33, Presentation to the Outer Planets Assessment Group, Alan Stern
 

Minor planet object articles (unnumbered)

Discoveries using the Hubble Space Telescope
New Horizons
20140806